Charles Jones (9 February 1870 – 25 March 1957) was an Australian cricketer. He played one first-class cricket match for Victoria in 1906. He played for Prahran in district cricket and captained the club.

See also
 List of Victoria first-class cricketers

References

External links
 

1870 births
1957 deaths
Australian cricketers
Victoria cricketers
Cricketers from Melbourne